Bang 3 is the second studio album by American rapper Chief Keef. The LP is a double album itself, serving as the third installment of Chief Keef's Bang trilogy. It was leaked online on August 1, 2015. Soon after the album was released officially on iTunes on August 3, 2015, through the label FilmOn Music. The second part of the album was released on September 18, 2015, as well as the double disc being available for purchase in stores. The album features guest appearances from ASAP Rocky, Mac Miller, Lil B and Jenn Em.

Since the album was originally slated for a December  2013 release, it was delayed several times, with numerous release dates falling through or never materializing. After Keef was dropped from Interscope, who owns the album name and its songs, it was unknown whether or not the album would ever be released.

In June 2015, Keef announced that the album would be released July 3, by FilmOnTV and Greek billionaire Alki David. The album was then pushed back to July 14, with "Ain't Missing You," the first post-Interscope single, released on the July 3, instead. However, the album was once again pushed back to August 18, until being released 2 weeks early on August 1. This was followed by Chief Keef announcing the second part of the album being released on August 18, only to be delayed again to September 18, while instead only releasing the single "Bouncin".

Background
Bang 3 was originally planned to be released on December 25, 2013, as a mixtape. However, in February 2014, Chief's manager, Peeda Pan, announced the project would be developed into a full-length album. In late February it was announced Chief Keef was planning to release the EP Bang 4, as a "preview" for Bang 3. However, as Bang 3, kept getting pushed back, so did Bang 4, until November when Chief Keef continued to go through with his plan of releasing the EP.

While Chief was still signed with Interscope Records, the label's executive, Larry Jackson, announced a June 10, 2014 release date. The album was later delayed to a September 30 release, and following another push back after that, Chief was dropped from Interscope Records. This is despite Jackson previously stating that he and the label were behind Keef and Bang 3. An AllHipHop report details Interscope's disinterest in releasing a follow-up album to Finally Rich. An anonymous source for the report details, "Keef’s team tried to have formal meetings but nothing moved." Legal issues that Keef dealt with seemed to cause Interscope to "subtly disassociate" with Keef.

Regardless, Chief Keef maintained that he would release the album himself, and after confirming his departure from the label, tweeted "One-hundred percent of everything goes to me now." Additionally, Keef confirmed that he would be planning a Christmas release for the album. However, once again, the album's release did not materialize.

Although delayed several times, Chief would release tracks from the album, to allow people to know that the album would still be eventually released. In July 2014, Chief Keef released a tentative track listing, revealing that Lil B will be featuring on the album. A$AP Rocky was also confirmed be featured on the album on the track "Superheroes". Fellow Chicago rapper and previous collaborator, Kanye West, was also set to feature on the track "Nobody", until that project developed into its own album. Keef decided to rework the entirety of Bang 3s track list, except for "Superheroes", which appeared on the final album. On July 25, 2015, Chief Keef organized a promotional concert for Bang 3, which also served as a charity concert to help out the victims of a drive-by shooting that left Keef's fellow Glo Gang member, Capo, as well as 13-month year old Dillan Harris dead. Due to outstanding warrants, Keef performed via hologram. However, during the concert, Hammond police shut down the concert.

On August 1, 2015, 2 songs from the album featuring A$AP Rocky and Mac Miller were leaked. Soon after the album was released for free as a mixtape on the website Hot New Hip Hop and other mixtape sites. The next day, the mixtape was removed from Hot New Hip Hop at the request of Alki David, and was made available through FilmOnTV for purchase. The official version was then made available for purchase on iTunes on August 3, 2015. Later that day Keef via social media, Keef told fans Bang 3 was a double disc album. On August 8 an official release date for the second part of Bang 3 was set for August 18 which was the original release date for the album. However, come August 18 the album was delayed to September 18th with a pre-order made available. The album would then be released on September 18 with a physical edition available which included both discs and advertising 3 bonus tracks (T'd, 'Ignorant' and 'Told Ya'). Due to a technical error, the 3 bonus tracks were not featured on the physical edition and as compensation an employee of FilmOn provided those with proof of purchase 2 extra tracks ('Off The Tooka/Tooka' and 'Real Money') as well as the original advertised 3 bonus tracks.

Reception 

Bang 3 was met with a generally positive  reception, critics argued that it's his most polished work since Finally Rich. "The higher, clearer production values are most immediately noticeable—this is the crispest-sounding Keef release since 2012's Finally Rich—and its well-ironed-out song structures." said Pitchfork. HipHopDX argued, "Bang 3 isn’t precisely a return to Finally Rich form as that version of Sosa may be long gone but,  it is the closest he’s gotten in his continuing journey of wide-ranging sonic discovery. It isn’t Chief Keef at his best or even his most interesting; it’s Keef at his most pliable." Critics also praised Chief Keef's growth and experimentation with Pitchfork saying, "it's the work of a mature rapper and songwriter, putting the skills he developed over several years spent branching out stylistically to good use". As of January 2017 Bang 3 Sold around 63,000 copies which includes 22,000 copies of streams in the US. HipHopDX weighed in that, "Singing To The Cheese,” eschews normal time in favor of Keef's abstract arrangements without unraveling; moving forward while also moving sideways. It's a reminder of everything Chief Keef has been and everything he can be." Tiny Mix Tapes also added, "Getting dropped from Interscope might be the best thing that ever happened to Chief Keef, or at least the best thing for his music (his recent partnership with FilmOn remains a mysterious business move that hasn't seemed to confine him creatively whatsoever). It’s hard to imagine a major-Keef getting away with the chorus on the massive, self-produced  opener “Pee Pee’d”.

Singles
On July 3, 2015, "Ain't Missing You", a tribute to Keef's late cousin and fellow Glo Gang member, Big Glo was released. The song featured Jenn Em and the video was released by FilmOnTV.

Track listing

Personnel 
Credits for Bang 3 adapted from liner notes in CD case

 Alki David — Executive Producer 
 Zaytoven — Producer 
 ChopSquad DJ — Producer 
 Brandon Howard — Producer 
 Slam — Producer 
 DP Beats — Producer
 Wolves — Producer
 Will-A-Fool — Producer 
 Ace Bankz — Producer 
 BillsProductions — Producer 
 ASAP Rocky — Featured Artist 
 Mac Miller — Featured Artist 
 Jenn Em — Featured Artist 
 Lil B — Featured Artist
 Tadoe — Featured Artist
 Chris Cheney - Mix Engineer / Engineer
 Nick Fainbarg - Mix Engineer / Engineer
 Brandon Balsz — Mix Engineer/Engineer 
 Josh Berg — Mix Engineer 
 Slavic Livins - Mix Engineer
 Adam Catania — Engineer 
 Frank Ramirez — Engineer 
 Andy Rodriguez — Assistant Engineer 
 Encore — Recording Studio 
 Paramount — Recording Studio 
 Ameraycan — Recording Studio 
 Costa Mesa Recording Studios - Recording Studio
 Grant Zimmerman — Project Coordinator/A&R
 Lamero Ragsdale — Art Cover/Art Direction 
 Chaz L. Morgan — Art Cover/Art Direction 
 Frank Torres — Art Cover/Art Direction 
 Rovaun Pierre "Uncle Ro" Manuel — Management 
 Idris "Peeda Pan" Wahid — Management

Charts 

Part 1

Part 2

Release history 
List of release dates, showing region, formats, label, editions and reference

References

Chief Keef albums
2015 albums
Sequel albums
Albums produced by Zaytoven